HRA may refer to:

Health and medicine
 Health risk assessment
 Health Reimbursement Account or Arrangement, US
 Health Research Authority, UK

Sport 
 Home runs allowed
 Horseracing Regulatory Authority, now merged into the British Horseracing Authority

Organisations
 Havering Residents Association
 Heritage Railway Association, British Isles
 Hindustan Republican Association
Hotel & Restaurant Association of Great Britain
 Human Rights Activists in Iran
 New York City Human Resources Administration

Science and technology 
 Heidelberg Research Architecture
 High Redundancy Actuation, a concept in fault tolerant control
 Honda Research America

Other uses
 H & R Firearms, marking on arms (for H&R Arms)
 Hariah railway station, Pakistan, station code
 Herra, a Finnish honorific
 Hrangkhol language of India, ISO 639-3 code
 Human reliability analysis
 Human Rights Act (disambiguation)
 Human resource accounting
 High Risk Area for piracy around the Horn of Africa

See also

 HRAS, gene that encodes transforming protein p21